2022 Henan banks protests are series of demonstrations against four regional lenders of Henan province over alleged financial corruption. Over the course of the previous two months, depositors have held multiple protests in the city of Zhengzhou, which serves as the capital of the province of Henan.

History

Background 
As of 2022, there are over 1,600 rural banks in China, located in 31 provinces, accounting for about 36% of the total number of banking financial institutions in the country. According to the statistics of the People's Bank of China, as of the second quarter of 2021, a total of 122 rural banks were high-risk institutions, occupying about 29% of all high-risk institutions.

Frozen accounts 
In April 2022, four rural banks in the Henan province stopped allowing customers to withdraw cash because "the banks were upgrading their systems". Thousands were denied access to their accounts, triggering a bank run as customers of the four bank attempted to withdraw their funds en-masse.

Later, however, it was noted that Sun Zhenfu, the main stockholder of the banks, had already been arrested by the government for "serious financial crimes" in March, and an investigation by the China Banking and Insurance Regulatory Commission (CBIRC) wrote that a private investment company collaborated with the banks to illicitly attract public funds via online platforms.

Customers started mounting small protests. A larger protest, involving thousands, took place on 23 May before being curtailed by police. The South China Morning Post and BBC reported fears that by June the Health Code system was being abused. By turning potential protesters' to code red they could be prevented from traveling.

CNN noted that a large number of the protesters were flying Chinese flags and carrying portraits of former Chairman Mao Zedong, indicating that their grievances are largely against the local authorities, which they seek the central government to address.

On July 10, a protest in Zhengzhou, attended by hundreds turned violent. An uniformed group of officers ran into the people protesting and started to physically assault protestors.

CBIRC responds 
On July 12, the CBIRC announced it would start reimbursing account holders, with deposits of up to 50,000 yuan ($7,400) being the first to be returned.

Afterwards, the amount of compensation for the number of deposits are gradually increasing:
up to 100,000 yuan ($14,787), on July 21.
up to 150,000 yuan, on August 1.
up to 250,000 yuan, on August 8.
up to 350,000 yuan, on August 15.
up to 400,000 yuan, on August 22.
up to 500,000 yuan, on August 30. And if it exceeds 500,000 yuan, compensation will be made according to the amount of 500,000, and the right to compensate beyond 500,000 yuan is reserved until the bank assets involved in this incident are properly disposed of. The amount of 500,000 yuan is the maximum compensation amount for deposit insurance.
On January 9, 2023, it was reported that the bank involved began to make an appointment to register depositors with more than 500,000 yuan.。

Effect to wider economy 
The Henan bank crisis is contributing to growing volatility in the Chinese financial system. Since at least 2022, there has been an increasing number of defaulted property loans recorded on the books of smaller, regional lenders. The Australian Financial Review reported that the Chinese government does not seem to have a satisfactory solution to the financial and property sector crisis.

Misinformation 
A video circulated on social media which claimed that the People's Liberation Army deployed tanks to defend the banks from the protesters. An Associated Press fact check found that the footage was from a routine training exercise in Shandong, more than 400 kilometers away.

References 

2022 protests
Finance in China
Protests in China
21st century in Henan